Newbold on Stour is a village in Warwickshire about  south of Stratford upon Avon. Population details are included within Tredington. The Church of England parish church of Saint David was built in 1833. It was restored in 1884-89 and the spire was removed in 1948. St. David's parish is now part of the Benefice of the Stourdene Group, which also includes the parishes of Alderminster, Butlers Marston, Ettington, Halford and Pillerton Hersey. Newbold has a village store and a public house: the White Hart.

References

Sources

External links

Villages in Warwickshire